An incomplete list of events in 1289 in Italy:

 Battle of Campaldino
The Battle of Campaldino was a battle between the Guelphs and Ghibellines on 11 June 1289.
 Battle of Colle Val d'Elsa
The Battle of Colle Val d'Elsa took place between 16 and 17 June 1287 at Colle di Val d'Elsa between the Ghibellines troops of Siena and the Guelph troops of Charles of Anjou and Florence, represented by fewer than 200 knights controlled by Neri de'Bardi.

Italy
Italy
Years of the 13th century in Italy